Tallapaka is a village and panchayat in Rajampet mandal of Annamayya district. It is 63 kms from Rayachoty. Tallapaka is the birthplace of Tallapaka Annamacharya.

Once Tallapaka was patronised as the living abode of Lord Venkateswara. Dr. Balaraju Krishnam Raju developed this village as a tourist location.

Population 
The 700-year-old village has a population of 7,658 with 600 houses.

References

External links
About Tallapaka

Villages in Kadapa district